Noël Lancien (24 December 1934 – 23 July 1999) was a French composer, conductor and music educator, first Grand Prix de Rome in 1958.

Life 
Born in Paris, spotted very early for his musical gifts, Lancien entered the Maîtrise de la Radio when it was created in 1945 and began composing. He joined the Conservatoire de Paris in rue de Madrid in 1949, and he obtained the First Prix de Rome in 1958 for his cantata Une mort de Don Quichotte. He studied musical analysis with Olivier Messiaen and musical composition with Tony Aubin and Darius Milhaud, and won a second conducting prize in 1959.

He was director of the Conservatoire de Toulouse from 1964 to 1970 and of the Conservatoire de Nancy from 1970 to 1997, and conductor of the Orchestre symphonique et lyrique de Nancy during the same period. He directs half of the programs, and brings to Nancy soloists such as Maurice André, Pierre Barbizet, Yuri Boukoff, Roger Bourdin, Jacqueline Brumaire, Annie Challan, Xavier Darasse, Christian Ferras, Jean-Jacques Kantorow, Alexandre Lagoya, Frédéric Lodéon, Mady Mesplé, Nathan Milstein, Daniel Wayenberg and Pierre Sancan.

Lancien died in Mauvages (Meuse)

Works 
Deux sonnets de Shakespeare for strings, flute, oboe, clarinet, bassoon and mezzo-soprano, 1954
Le bal des champs de M. Desbordes-Valmor for voice and piano, 1955
Trois Ballades de François Villon for four mixed voices a capella, 1955
Chanson de Clément Marot for Choir, 1956
Suite bretonne for flute, oboe, harp, string quartet, 1956
 Couples fervents et doux de A. de Noailles for voice and piano, 1956
 Le mariage forcé, after Molière, 1956
 Petite Valse for piano, 1956
 Toccata for piano, 1956
 24 harmonisations de chansons populaires for Choir, 1956–74
 22e Ode de Ronsard for voice and piano, 1957
 La Fée Urgèle, Cantata, 1957
 Vantardises d'un marin breton ivre de Max Jacob for voice and piano, 1958
 Sonate for piano and cello, 1958
 Chantefleurs et Chantefables de Robert Desnos, 1958
 Le cimetière des fous de Paul Eluard for bass and orchestra, 1958
 Une mort de Don Quichotte, cantata, 1958
 Petite valse for string quartet, 1959
 Thème et variations for cello and piano, 1960
 Quatre prières à la Vierge for soprano and orchestra, 1961
 Concerto for trumpet and string quartet, 1961
 Vers à mettre en chant de Boileau for baritone and orchestra, 1968
 Première Position for piano, 1968
 Vocalises for trumpet and piano, 1968
 Fuguette for piano, 1984
 Toute Petite Suite for guitar, 1986
 Ballade des Dames de Nancy d'après François Villon for four mixed voices, 1993
 Montes Gelboë, in memoriam Robert Planel for saxophone and piano, 1994

References

External links 

1934 births
1999 deaths
20th-century French conductors (music)
20th-century French male musicians
French classical composers
French male classical composers
French male conductors (music)
Conservatoire de Paris alumni
Musicians from Paris
Prix de Rome for composition